Mayo-Kebbi Ouest is one of the 23 regions of Chad. Its capital is Pala. It is composed of the southern areas of the former prefecture of Mayo-Kebbi (sub-prefectures of Pala and Léré).

Geography
The region borders Mayo-Kebbi Est Region to the north-east, Tandjilé Region to the east, Logone Occidental Region to the south-east, and Cameroon to the west and north-west. The Mayo Kébbi river flows through the north the region, with Lake Léré and the smaller Lake Tréné located in the north-west.

Settlements
Palais the regional capital; other major settlements include Binder, Guégou, Lagon, Lamé, Léré and Torrock.

Demographics 
As per the 2009 Chadian census, the region had 564,470 inhabitants. The main ethnolinguistic groups are the Fula, Gidar, Mangbai, Mundang, Ngeté-Herdé peoples, Peve, Sara groups such as the Ngambay, and Tupuri.

Subdivisions
The region of Mayo-Kebbi Ouest is divided into two departments:

References

 
Regions of Chad